Leptomyrmex puberulus is a species of ant in the genus Leptomyrmex. Described by William Morton Wheeler in 1934, the species is endemic to New Guinea.

References

Dolichoderinae
Insects of New Guinea
Insects described in 1934
Endemic fauna of New Guinea